Sargocentron borodinoensis, the Borodino soldierfish, is a member of the genus Sargocentron found in the Western Pacific Ocean in the Philippine Sea. It was discovered by the Borodino Submarine Elevation along one of the mountains, and is named in honor of it.

References

borodinoensis
Fish of the Pacific Ocean
Fish described in 2017
Taxa named by Aleksandr Nicholaevich Kotlyar